Allentown State Hospital was a psychiatric hospital located at 1600 Hanover Avenue in Allentown, Pennsylvania. It served the counties of Lehigh, Northampton, Carbon, Monroe, Pike, and occasionally eastern Schuylkill. It was one of seven remaining psychiatric hospitals in Pennsylvania. Allentown State Hospital was demolished on December 28th, 2020.

History
Allentown State Hospital was planned as early as 1901 but the opening was delayed until October 3, 1912. The hospital cost $1,931,270 to build. The population hit its peak in 1950 with 2,012 patients. In November 1998, Allentown State Hospital was the first psychiatric hospital in the United States to be completely seclusion-free. Due to current community mental health efforts, the hospital's occupancy fell to as low as 175 patients.

Status and future
Due to the sharp decline in the need for psychiatric hospitals, the Pennsylvania Department of Public Welfare has closed the hospital. Some residents have been transferred to the Wernersville State Hospital in Berks County. Others have been placed in residential-care settings within the community. The hospital closed on December 17, 2010. The hospital was announced as the site of filming for the upcoming M. Night Shyamalan film Glass, a sequel to the films Unbreakable and Split. The Pennsylvania Department of General Services has placed bids to demolish all the buildings on the property (including the historic main building) by the end of 2019, after which time the property will be purchased by TCA Properties of Doylestown.

In popular culture
Parts of the 2019 movie Glass were filmed in Allentown at the Allentown State Hospital and elsewhere.

See also
 List of historic places in Allentown, Pennsylvania

References

External links
Historical Site
Hospital-Data page

Hospital buildings completed in 1913
Psychiatric hospitals in Pennsylvania
Hospitals in the Lehigh Valley
Defunct hospitals in Pennsylvania
Buildings and structures in Allentown, Pennsylvania
1913 establishments in Pennsylvania
Hospitals disestablished in 2010